
Citrus myrtifolia, the myrtle-leaved orange tree, is a species of Citrus with foliage similar to that of the common myrtle.

The fruit of the tree resemble small oranges. It has a bitter flavor and is commonly called by its Italian name, chinotto. It is an essential flavoring agent of most Italian amari, of the popular Campari apéritif, and of several brands of carbonated soft drinks that are generically called "chinotto".

Citrus myrtifolia is sometimes planted in gardens. Due to its compactness, it can also be planted in a pot or other container.

Synonyms

 Citrus aurantium var. myrtifolia Ker-Gawl. in Bot. Reg. vol. 4, t. 346, in textu. 1818.
 Citrus pumila Marc. in Izv. Sochin. Obl. Sukhum. Stants. vol. 2. 1921.

References

 Chandler, W. H., S. N. Hooper & M. J. Harvey - Evergreen Orchards. Kimpton London 1958: 535 pp.
 Facciola, S. - Cornucopia. A Source Book of Edible Plants. Kampong Publ. Vista 1990: 677 pp.
 Hodgson, R. W. (1965): "Taxonomy and nomenclature in the Citrus" (pp 317–331) - In: S. Krishnamurthi (ed.) - Advances in Agriculture Sciences and Their Applications. Agric. Coll. Res. Inst. Coimbatore.
 Mortensen, E. & E. T. Bullard - Handbook of Tropical and Subtropical Horticulture. (3rd ed. 1966). Department of State Agency for International Development Washington 1964: 260 pp.
 Morton, J. F. (ed.) - Fruits of Warm Climates. Creative Resource System, Winterville, N.C. 1987: 505 pp.
 Swingle, W. T. (1946): "The botany of Citrus and its wild relatives of the orange subfamily (family Rutaceae, subfamily Aurantioideae)" (pp 129–474) - In: H. J. Webber & L. D. Batchelor (eds.) - The Citrus Industry. Vol. 1. History, botany and breeding Univ. of California Press Berkeley: 1028 pp.
 Tanaka, T. - Species problem in Citrus. A critical study of wild and cultivated units of Citrus, based upon field studies in their native homes. Japanese Society for the Promotion of Science Ueno 1954: 152 pp.
 Webber, H. J. (1946): "Cultivated varieties of Citrus" (pp 475–668) - In: H. J. Webber & L. D. Batchelor (eds.) - The Citrus Industry; 1. History, botany and breeding Univ. of California Press Berkeley: 1028 pp.

External links

 NCBI Taxonomy Database
 Mansfield's World Database of Agricultural and Horticultural Crops
 USDA Germplasm Resources Information Network (GRIN) entry 

myrtifolia
Citrus
Ornamental trees
Taxa named by Constantine Samuel Rafinesque